East Buffalo Peak, elevation , is a summit in the Mosquito Range of central Colorado. East Buffalo Peak and West Buffalo Peak compose what is called Buffalo Peaks.

See also
Buffalo Peaks Wilderness

References

Mountains of Colorado
Mountains of Park County, Colorado
Mountains of Chaffee County, Colorado
North American 4000 m summits